Nowgak (also Romanized as Naogak and Naugak; also known as Qal‘eh-ye Nowkak) is a village in Rostam-e Seh Rural District, Sorna District, Rostam County, Fars Province, Iran. At the 2006 census, its population was 535, in 111 families.

References 

Populated places in Rostam County